TPC San Antonio is a golf resort in the south central United States, located in the Cibolo Canyons area north of San Antonio, Texas.

Opened in February 2010, the resort features two 18-hole golf courses: the AT&T Canyons Course designed by Pete Dye, in consultation with Bruce Lietzke, and the AT&T Oaks Course designed by Greg Norman, in consultation with Sergio García. Both courses are members of the Tournament Players Club network operated by the PGA Tour; the Oaks Course has hosted the tour's Valero Texas Open since 2010. The Canyons course was the venue for the AT&T Championship on the Champions Tour from 2011 to 2015.

Scorecard

References

External links

PGA Tour – Valero Texas Open – TPC San Antonio – Oaks Course
Golf Texas – TPC San Antonio – Canyons Course
Oaks Course

Golf clubs and courses in Texas
Sports venues in San Antonio
Golf clubs and courses designed by Pete Dye